This is a list of driver records in the GP2 Series, since 2005. Drivers who have competed in the 2015 GP2 Series are highlighted in bold. This list does not count results in the sister GP2 Asia Series. This list is accurate up to the 2015 final round. It does not include data from the non-championship races held in 2011.

Wins

Total wins

Most consecutive wins

Total wins in feature races

Total wins in sprint races

Pole positions

Total pole positions
(Reverse grid pole positions do not count for this classification)

Most consecutive pole positions
(Reverse grid pole positions do not count for this classification)

Podiums

Total podiums

Most podiums in a season

Fastest laps

Total fastest laps

Points

Total points

Most points in a season

Starts

Total Starts

 
Lists of auto racing people